Igriés is a small village located in the Hoya de Huesca, in the province of Aragón in northern Spain.

Geography
Situated south of the Pyrenees, about nine kilometers to the north of Huesca, along the road to Sabiñánigo, in the valley of the river Isuela, and near the Satocobá mountain. The municipality of Igriés also includes the small village of Yéqueda.

History
Igréis was first mentioned in 1104, by the Bishop of Huesca and Montearagón. (Ubieto Arteta, Cartulario de Montearagón, nº. 38)

Politics

Demographics

Notable Locations
Igriés is home to the Hermitage of San Juan, dating to the 12th century. A military base shares the village's name, and is nearby.

References

External links
 http://www.ine.es/

Municipalities in the Province of Huesca